Fuller or Fuller's may refer to:

People
 Fuller (surname)
 A fuller, a worker who cleanses wool through the process of fulling
 Fuller (artist), a British artist known for making map art and intricate drawings

Places
 Fuller, Kansas, an unincorporated community in Crawford County, United States
 Fuller, Michigan, a former community in Michigan
 Fuller, Pennsylvania, an unincorporated community, United States
 Fuller Lake, a body of water in Pennsylvania, United States

Companies
 Fuller's Brewery in London, England, United Kingdom
 Fuller Brush Company
 Fuller's Coffee Shop, a coffee shop in Oregon, United States
 Fuller Manufacturing, a subsidiary of Eaton Corporation acquired in 1958
 Fuller Theological Seminary, in Pasadena, California, United States

Other uses
 Fuller calculator, an advanced cylindrical slide rule with a helical scale
 Fuller's earth, clay used for filtering and purifying 
 Fuller (metalworking), a tool used to form metal when hot
 Fuller (weapon), a groove in a knife or sword blade to lighten and stiffen the blade
 USS Fuller, the name of two ships of the U.S. Navy

See also